Chattanooga Creek is a stream in Walker County, Georgia and Hamilton County, Tennessee.

Chattanooga is a Muskogean-language name meaning "rock coming to a point".

At the USGS station  at Flintstone, Georgia, Chattanooga Creek has a discharge of 105 cubic feet per second.

See also
List of rivers of Georgia (U.S. state)
List of rivers of Tennessee

References

Rivers of Walker County, Georgia
Rivers of Hamilton County, Tennessee
Rivers of Georgia (U.S. state)
Rivers of Tennessee